Braeholm is an unincorporated community in Logan County, West Virginia, United States. It is within the Amherstdale census-designated place.

Braeholm was affected by the Buffalo Creek flood which killed and injured, and left many people homeless.

References

Unincorporated communities in Logan County, West Virginia
Unincorporated communities in West Virginia
Coal towns in West Virginia